Herman Georges Berger (1 August 1875 in Bassens – 13 January 1924 in Nice) was a French épée and foil fencer and Olympic champion in épée competition.

He received a gold medal in épée team at the 1908 Summer Olympics in London.

References

External links

French male épée fencers
French male foil fencers
Olympic fencers of France
Fencers at the 1900 Summer Olympics
Fencers at the 1908 Summer Olympics
Olympic gold medalists for France
1875 births
1924 deaths
Olympic medalists in fencing
Medalists at the 1908 Summer Olympics
People from Gironde
20th-century French people